The Bishop's Castle (also: Unteres Schloss) is a castle in the municipality of Fürstenau of the Canton of Graubünden in Switzerland.  It is a Swiss heritage site of national significance. The castle dates to the mid-to-late 13th century, while the current structure is from the early 18th century.

See also
 List of castles in Switzerland

References

Fürstenau, Switzerland
Cultural property of national significance in Graubünden
Castles in Graubünden